The 2020–21 season was the 126th season in existence of West Ham United Football Club and the club's ninth consecutive season in the top flight of English football. In addition to the domestic league, West Ham United participated in this season's edition of the FA Cup, and reached the fourth round of the EFL Cup. They finished sixth in the Premier League achieving 65 points, a club record. They also won 19 games and nine away games, also records. Their league positioned qualified them to play in the 2021–22 UEFA Europa League.

Season squad

Transfers

Transfers in

Loans in

Loans out

Transfers out

Pre-season and friendlies
In March 2020, West Ham announced their participation in a July 2020 tournament, the EVA Air Queensland Champions Cup, in Queensland, Australia alongside Brisbane Roar and Crystal Palace. Following the outbreak of COVID-19, the tour was cancelled.

Competitions

Overview

Premier League

League table

Results summary

Results by matchday

Matches
The 2020–21 season fixtures were released on 20 August.

FA Cup

The third round draw was made on 30 November, with Premier League and EFL Championship clubs all entering the competition. The draw for the fourth and fifth round were made on 11 January, conducted by Peter Crouch.

EFL Cup

The draw for both the second and third round were confirmed on 6 September, live on Sky Sports by Phil Babb. The fourth round draw was conducted on 17 September 2020 by Laura Woods and Lee Hendrie live on Sky Sports.

Statistics
 ''Correct as of 23 May 2021

Appearances and goals

|-
! colspan=14 style=background:#dcdcdc; text-align:center| Goalkeepers

|-
! colspan=14 style=background:#dcdcdc; text-align:center| Defenders

|-
! colspan=14 style=background:#dcdcdc; text-align:center| Midfielders

|-
! colspan=14 style=background:#dcdcdc; text-align:center| Forwards

|-
! colspan=14 style=background:#dcdcdc; text-align:center| Players who left the club on loan or permanently during the season

|}

Goalscorers

References

External links

West Ham United F.C. seasons
West Ham United F.C.
West Ham
West Ham